The Deepdale River is a river of New Zealand located in the Tasman Region of the South Island.

The Deepdale flows generally north from its source in the Brunner Range north of Mount Pelion, within Victoria Forest Park, forming a deep valley.

See also
List of rivers of New Zealand

References

Land Information New Zealand - Search for Place Names

Rivers of the Tasman District
Rivers of New Zealand